MKR may refer to

My Kitchen Rules, an Australian reality television series
My Kitchen Rules NZ, a New Zealand adaptation
My Kitchen Rules (U.S. TV series), an American adaptation
My Kitchen Rules SA, a South African adaptation
MKR (missile), a Soviet cruise missile study 1957–1960
Interdynamics MKR, a Swedish assault rifle prototype
Lincoln MKR, an automobile
Meekatharra Airport, IATA airport code "MKR"